Football Club Tiszaújváros is a professional football club based in Tiszaújváros, Borsod-Abaúj-Zemplén County, Hungary, that competes in the Nemzeti Bajnokság III, the third tier of Hungarian football.

Name changes
1960–62: Tiszavidéki Vegyi Kombinát Sport Club
1962–63: Tiszai Vegyi Kombinát Sport Club
1963: merger with Tiszapalkonyai Erőmű Vasas
1963–70: Tiszaszederkényi Munkás Testedző Kör
1970–79: Leninvárosi MTK
1979–89: Olefin Sport Club
1989–93: TVK Olefin SC
1993–98: Tiszaújvárosi Sport Club
1998–2003: Tiszaújvárosi Futball Club
2003–05: Tiszaújváros Labdarúgásáért Egyesület
2005–13: Football Club Tiszaújváros
2013–present: Termálfürdő Football Club Tiszaújváros

Honours
Nemzeti Bajnokság III:
Winner: 1996–97

Managers
  Máté Gerliczki (2016-present)

Season results
As of 6 August 2017

R = Round of

External links
 Profile on Magyar Futball

References

Football clubs in Hungary
Association football clubs established in 1960
1960 establishments in Hungary